Amber Probe is the debut EP from Philadelphia underground hip hop duo Jedi Mind Tricks, released on November 5, 1996. The tracks "Neva Antiquated (Dark Jedi Remix)", "Communion: The Crop Circle Thesis" and "Books of Blood: The Coming of Tan" were all included on their full-length debut, The Psycho-Social, Chemical, Biological & Electro-Magnetic Manipulation of Human Consciousness, the following year.

Track listing 
All songs produced by Stoupe the Enemy of Mankind

1996 debut EPs
Jedi Mind Tricks albums
Hip hop EPs